Reinventing Comics: How Imagination and Technology Are Revolutionizing an Art Form (2000) is a book written by comic book writer and artist Scott McCloud. It is a thematic sequel to his critically acclaimed Understanding Comics, and was followed by Making Comics.

Publication history 
Reinventing Comics was released in 2000 in separate editions published by Paradox Press and William Morrow Paperbacks. Paradox Press, formerly an imprint of DC Comics, is now defunct; and William Morrow is now a division of HarperCollins, so subsequent printings of the book have been released by HarperCollins.

Summary
Reinventing Comics explains twelve "revolutions" which McCloud predicts are necessary  for the comic book to survive as a medium, focusing especially on online comics and CD-ROM comics. The book caused considerable controversy in the comics industry, McCloud famously noting that it had been described as "dangerous".

As promised in the book, McCloud has offered annotations, addenda and his further-developing thoughts about the future of comics on his website. In particular, he considers his webcomic I Can't Stop Thinking to be a continuation of Reinventing Comics, though he has continued to write about the future of comics in many different forms, as he acknowledges Reinventing Comics is "a product of its time".

Development
McCloud drew Reinventing Comics digitally, using a small Wacom tablet. Because of the low power of the machine he was using, McCloud had a difficult time working on the book. In an interview with Joe Zabel, McCloud stated that he was so eager to get to the second half of the book that he rushed through the first portion.

A revised version of Reinventing Comics was released in 2009. Here, McCloud cited various successful webcomics that pushed the envelope, such as Daniel Merlin Goodbrey's work with the "Tarquin Engine" and Drew Weing's Pup Contemplates the Heat Death of the Universe.

Fantagraphics Books Inc. editor and publisher Gary Groth wrote a critique of Reinventing Comics in 2001.

See also
 Comics studies

References

External links
Scott McCloud page

Books by Scott McCloud
2000 non-fiction books
Books of literary criticism
Books about comics
Comics about comics
Paradox Press titles
Non-fiction graphic novels